Henry the Fat may refer to:
Henry, Margrave of Frisia (died 1101)
Henry I, Count of Anhalt (died 1252)
Henry I of Cyprus (died 1253)
Henry I of Navarre (died 1274)
Henry V, Duke of Legnica (died 1296)
Henry IV, Duke of Mecklenburg (died 1477)